The Maas–Waal Canal (Dutch: Maas–Waalkanaal) is a canal in the Netherlands that connects the river Meuse (Dutch: Maas) to the river Waal. The connection of the Meuse and the Maas–Waal Canal is the tripoint between the provinces of Gelderland, Limburg and North Brabant.

History 
Construction on the canal began in 1920. On 27 October 1927, the waterway was officially opened by HM Queen Wilhelmina.

The consequences for the village of Heumen were unmistakable.  It became isolated in a hard to reach corner between the Meuse and the canal.  The village of Neerbosch was cut in half, and the centre of the village of Hatert was torn down to make room for a bridge across the canal.  The village also lost its church and both pubs.

In 1970, it was decided to widen the canal at an estimated cost of 117 million Dutch guilders (53 million euro).  At around the same time, the city of Nijmegen decided to construct a new neighborhood, Dukenburg, on the far (Western) side of the canal.  Less than 10 years later, another neighborhood, Lindenholt, was added in the area where the older part of Neerbosch had been.  This left the canal lying largely inside the built-up area of Nijmegen.

In 2002, H. van Eeuwijk and G. J. Nillesen published their booklet Three-quarter Century of Maas–Waal Canal 1927–2002 on the occasion of the 75th anniversary of the connection between the Maas and Waal.

Water level 

Although the canal is located entirely in Gelderland, the management is in the hands of Rijkswaterstaat directorate Limburg.  There is a lock in Weurt, and another one in Heumen, but the latter is almost always open.  This is because the water of the Maas at Heumen is maintained at a constant level through a weir in Grave.

This allowed container ships with four layers of containers to  use of the canal. Raising the water level in the canal will lead to higher groundwater levels in areas directly adjacent to the canal. Rijkswaterstaat will construct a drainage system to prevent possible negative consequences.

Bridges 
From north to south, the Maas–Waal Canal is bridged by the following roads:
 Industrieweg (across the lock at Weurt)
 Neerbosscheweg (called the "Neerbossche Brug")
 Graafseweg (called the "Graafse Brug")
 New Dukenburgseweg (called the "Dukenburgse Brug")
 Hatertseweg (called the "Hatertse Brug")
 Blankenbergseweg (called "the Hoge Brug")
 Jan J. Luden Avenue (across the lock at Heumen)

References

External links 
 Current Information – Public Works
 Channels in the Netherlands – Maas–Waal Canal

Footnotes 

Canals in the Rhine–Meuse–Scheldt delta
Canals opened in 1927